Aq Daraq (also Romanized as Āq Daraq; also known as Āgh Daraq) is a village in Meshgin-e Sharqi Rural District, in the Central District of Meshgin Shahr County, Ardabil Province, Iran. At the 2006 census, its population was 164, in 42 families.

References 

Towns and villages in Meshgin Shahr County